Collected 1996–2005 is a greatest hits / best of compilation by American rock band the Wallflowers. It was released on June 16, 2009 by Interscope Records. It includes all the singles from their four albums on the label, Bringing Down the Horse (1996), Breach (2000), Red Letter Days (2002), and Rebel, Sweetheart (2005). In addition to singles and selected album tracks, the compilation includes two previously unreleased recordings, "Eat You Sleeping" and a demo version of "God Says Nothing Back".

Track listing

Best Buy Exclusive 
Best Buy carried an exclusive two-disc version of the compilation.  In addition to the audio CD, a DVD was also included and featured all eight music videos from this time period:

Personnel

The Wallflowers 
 Jakob Dylan – lead vocals, rhythm guitar
 Rami Jaffee – Hammond B3 organ, backing vocals, keyboards, piano
 Greg Richling – bass guitar, background vocals
 Michael Ward – lead guitar, backing vocals
 Mario Calire – drums

Additional musicians 
 Jay Joyce
 Fred Tackett
 Tom Lord-Alge – engineering, mixing
 Jon Brion
 T-Bone Burnett – production
 Mike Campbell – slide guitar 
 Matt Chamberlain – all drums (Tracks 1–5)
 Adam Duritz 
 Don Heffington
 Leo LeBlanc 
 Gary Louris 
 Tobi Miller
 Michael Penn 
 Sam Phillips 
 David Rawlings
 Patrick Warren
 Lenny Castro – additional percussion
 Val Mccallum – guitar
 Ben Peeler – slide guitar

Additional credits 
 Photo Coordinator: Ryan Null
 Photography: Ken Schles
 Digitally Remastered by: Gavin Lurssen
 Mastering Assistant: Danc C. Smart

Charts

References

External links

Album chart usages for BillboardAlbumSales
Album chart usages for Billboard200
The Wallflowers compilation albums
Interscope Records compilation albums
2009 greatest hits albums